Kaldred is a holiday home area in Kalundborg Municipality, in the Region Zealand. Kaldred is only a few kilometers from Saltbæk Vig and Sejerø Bugt.

Transport
Kalundborg Airport, also called Kaldred Airport, is located between the holiday home area and Saltbæk Vig. It is owned by Kalundborg Municipality and is used especially by gliders and motor pilots from Kalundborg Flyveklub, which has been based here since 1961, and Polyteknisk Flyvegruppe.

References 

Cities and towns in Region Zealand
Kalundborg Municipality